Yudhpath  is a 1992 Bollywood film directed by Ravi Ravan Kathuria and starring Sudesh Berry, Mohnish Bahl, Kiran Kumar, Rakesh Bedi, Tinnu Anand and Siddharth Ray. The movie was released on  27 March 1992. The film is an action movie.

Cast 
 Sudesh Berry
 Mohnish Bahl
 Kiran Kumar
 Rakesh Bedi
 Tinnu Anand
 Siddharth Ray

Soundtrack

References

External links
 

1990s Hindi-language films
1992 films
Films scored by Dilip Sen-Sameer Sen